¿Por qué diablos? (literally "Why Devils?", although it can also mean Why the hell?, itself a pun on the main character's nickname, "Diablo") is a 1999-2000 Colombian telenovela produced by Cenpro TV and broadcast on Canal Uno. It starred Manolo Cardona, Marcela Carvajal, Paola Rey, and Victor Mallarino. It was directed by Sergio Osorio.

The telenovela focuses on a poor teenage boy named Juan Cantor (AKA Juan Diablo), part of an international ring of underage thieves. After his best friend dies in a shooting, he decides to avenge his friend's death by killing the head of the organization, La Araña (The Spider). He uses his skills to gain the trust of the Leader and that way gets closer to him. The young man is later sent to a juvenile facility, and there, he falls in love with his psychologist who was also the wife of his boss.

As of May 2008 Telemundo was planning on including a remake of the series in its 2008-09 U.S. prime-time television lineup. It later came to be known as Más Sabe el Diablo, broadcast in 2009.

Cast
Manolo Cardona as Juan 'Diablo' Cantor
Marcela Carvajal as Ángela Falla de Carbonell
Víctor Mallarino as Eduardo 'La Araña' Carbonell
Paola Andrea Rey as Jazmín 'Jaz' Cordero
Marcela Gallego as Teresa Cantor
Consuelo Luzardo as Purita de Carbonell
Frank Ramírez as Boris Mondragón
Diego Trujillo as Martín Pedraza
Carlos Congote as Federico Ponce
Quique Mendoza as Toño Mondragón
Ramiro Meneses as Juvenal Torres Useche
Walter Díaz as Reinerio 'Doggie' Palacios
Angarita Monazzani as Luisa Carbonell Falla
Maribel Abello as Claudia Riascos
Johnny Acero as Aurelio 'Gaviota' Restrepo
Pilar Álvarez as Faustina "Tina" Cordero
Jaime Barbini as Samir Riascos
Jorge Iván Duarte as Freddy 'Gordo' Cordero
Juan Manuel Gallego as Jhon Freddy 'El Trompo'
Javier Gnecco as Juan Eduardo Carbonell
Adriana López as Lili Chaparro
Gonzalo Zagarminaga as Jordain Simenon
María José Martínez as Cata
César Navarro as Ignacio Álvarez 'El Ñato'
Cecilia Navia as Genoveva Arbeláez
Freddy Ordóñez as Jesús 'Chucho' Ortiz
Inés Oviedo as Marlenis de Torres
Humberto Rivera as Ancizar Gordillo
Néstor Alfonso Rojas as 'El guajiro'
Edgardo Román as Edilberto Otálora 'Don Carlitos'
Julián Román as Rubén 'La Chanda' Guerra
Jorge Rubiano as Edgar 'La Rata' Romero
Carolina Trujillo as Lía de Falla
Germán Castelblanco/Fernando Arévalo as Coronel Arbeláez
Patricia Tamayo as Martica
Elkin Córdoba as Fortunato Palacios

External links 
 Colarte

Colombian telenovelas
1999 telenovelas
1999 Colombian television series debuts
2000 Colombian television series endings